Tefflus is a genus of large, black and flightless Afrotropical ground beetles in the tribe Panagaeini. They are broadly similar to the Anthiini ('oogpisters'), but are not colourful, and have a six-sided and flattish pronotum. The distinct longitudinal carinae (ridges) on their elytra are separated by two rows of punctures running along the striae (grooves). Males have some segments of the forelegs enlarged.

They are solitary and mostly nocturnal hunters, that move about at a brisk pace. They have strong mandibles that can inflict a serious bite, and prey on a variety of invertebrates. The last revision of the genus was undertaken in 1946.

Species
Some 14 to 15 species are native to the Afrotropics:

 Tefflus angustipes Kolbe, 1903
 Tefflus brevicostatus Quedenfeldt, 1883
 Tefflus camerunus Kolbe, 1903
 Tefflus carinatus Klug, 1853 – Malawi, South Africa (length: c.26–37 mm)
 Tefflus hamiltonii Bates, 1871
 Tefflus juvenilis Gerstaecker, 1871
 Tefflus kilimanus Kolbe, 1897
 Tefflus meyerlei (Fabricius, 1801) – South Africa (length: c.39–54 mm)
 Tefflus muata Harold, 1878
 Tefflus purpureipennis Quedenfeldt, 1883
 Tefflus raffrayi Chaudoir, 1874
 Tefflus tenuicollis Fairmaire, 1894
 Tefflus viridanus Kolbe, 1897
 Tefflus zanzibaricus Kolbe, 1886
 Tefflus zebulianus Raffray, 1882

References

Panagaeinae